A total solar eclipse occurred on April 28, 1930. A solar eclipse occurs when the Moon passes between Earth and the Sun, thereby totally or partly obscuring the image of the Sun for a viewer on Earth. A total solar eclipse occurs when the Moon's apparent diameter is larger than the Sun's, blocking all direct sunlight, turning day into darkness. Totality occurs in a narrow path across Earth's surface, with the partial solar eclipse visible over a surrounding region thousands of kilometres wide. This event is a hybrid, starting and ending as an annular eclipse.

The path of totality crossed the eastern Pacific Ocean, northwestern United States, and across central and eastern Canada, and northern Labrador of the Dominion of Newfoundland (today's Newfoundland and Labrador in Canada).

Related eclipses

Solar eclipses 1928–1931

Saros 137 

It is a part of Saros cycle 137, repeating every 18 years, 11 days, containing 70 events. The series started with partial solar eclipse on May 25, 1389. It contains total eclipses from August 20, 1533, through December 6, 1695, first set of hybrid eclipses from December 17, 1713, through February 11, 1804, first set of annular eclipses from February 21, 1822, through March 25, 1876, second set of hybrid eclipses from April 6, 1894, through April 28, 1930, and second set of annular eclipses from May 9, 1948, through April 13, 2507. The series ends at member 70 as a partial eclipse on June 28, 2633. The longest duration of totality was 2 minutes, 55 seconds on September 10, 1569. Solar Saros 137 has 55 umbral eclipses from August 20, 1533, through April 13, 2507 (973.62 years).

Inex series

Notes

References

 The solar eclipse of April 28, 1930 Popular Astronomy, Vol. 38, p. 537, Makemson, Maud W. 
 The Central Solar Eclipse of April 28, 1930 Journal of the Royal Astronomical Society of Canada, Vol. 24, p. 55 

1930 04 28
1930 in science
1930 04 28
April 1930 events